Lance Lewis (born November 1, 1988) is a former American football wide receiver. He was signed by the Washington Redskins as an undrafted free agent in 2012 and, following a successful tryout, returned to the team in 2013. He played college football for East Carolina University.He has also played for the Dallas Cowboys and San Francisco 49ers.

Professional career

Washington Redskins
Lewis was signed by the Washington Redskins as an undrafted free agent on April 29, 2012. In early August, he suffered a groin injury that caused him to be inactive for the 2012 preseason. He was waived with an injury settlement on August 27.

Lewis returned to the Redskins on May 14, 2013 following a successful tryout during the team's rookie mini-camp in early May. The Redskins waived him on August 31, 2013 for final roster cuts before the start of 2013 season, he was signed to the team's practice squad the next day. Lewis was signed to the active roster on November 21, 2013 after the team placed Leonard Hankerson to injured reserve. He was waived on December 18, 2013.

Dallas Cowboys
On December 20, 2013, Lewis signed to the practice squad of the Dallas Cowboys. Ten days later, the Cowboys signed him to a futures contract.

San Francisco 49ers
Lewis signed a two-year deal with the San Francisco 49ers on August 9, 2014. Lewis was waived on April 30, 2015.

New Orleans Saints
On May 19, 2015, Lewis signed with the New Orleans Saints. The Saints waived him on September 1 as part of final roster cuts before the start of the season.

Bismarck Bucks
Joined the Bismarck Bucks of the Champions Indoor Football League (CIF).

References

External links
East Carolina Pirates bio
Washington Redskins bio
Dallas Cowboys bio

1988 births
Living people
Players of American football from North Carolina
American football wide receivers
East Carolina Pirates football players
Washington Redskins players
Dallas Cowboys players
San Francisco 49ers players
Bismarck Bucks players